SW6 may refer to:
SW postcode area
Fulham
West London derby
Legion of Super-Heroes
Star Wars Episode VI: Return of the Jedi
The codename for Th13teen at Alton Towers, England.
SW6 tram, a class of electric trams built by the Melbourne & Metropolitan Tramways Board.
Layar LRT station, Singapore